Stefan Van Riel (born 29 December 1970) is a Belgian former professional footballer who played as a defender.

Career
In 1992, Van Riel signed for Belgian second tier side Sint-Niklaas. In 1994, he signed for Eendracht Aalst in the Belgian top flight, where he made 97 appearances and scored 4 goals. On 21 August 1994, Van Riel debuted for Eendracht Aalst during a 3–2 win over Beerschot. On 27 August 1995, he scored his first goal for Eendracht Aalst during a 4–1 win over Lommel.

In 1998, Van Riel signed for Swedish club Trelleborg. After that, he signed for Oostende in the Belgian top flight. In 1999, he signed for Belgian third tier team Schoten after trialing for Wolverhampton Wanderers in the English second tier and Dutch second tier outfit TOP Oss.

References

External links
 Stefan Van Riel at playmakerstats.com

Living people
1970 births
Belgian footballers
Footballers from Antwerp
Association football defenders
Belgian Pro League players
Challenger Pro League players
Belgian Third Division players
Allsvenskan players
K. Sint-Niklase S.K.E. players
S.C. Eendracht Aalst players
Trelleborgs FF players
K.V. Oostende players
S.K. Beveren players
Belgian expatriate footballers
Belgian expatriate sportspeople in Sweden
Expatriate footballers in Sweden